The 1978 Senior League World Series took place from August 14–19 in Gary, Indiana, United States. Hualien, Taiwan defeated Burbank, Illinois in the championship game. It was Taiwan's seventh straight championship.

Teams

Results

References

Senior League World Series
Senior League World Series
Baseball competitions in Indiana
Sports in Gary, Indiana
1978 in sports in Indiana